Mission Heights Preparatory High School (MHPHS) is a public charter high school in Casa Grande, Arizona, United States. It was established in 2011 and is operated by The Leona Group.

For athletics, it is a member of the Canyon Athletic Association (CAA).

References 

The Leona Group
Schools in Pinal County, Arizona
Buildings and structures in Casa Grande, Arizona
Public high schools in Arizona
Charter schools in Arizona
2011 establishments in Arizona
Educational institutions established in 2011